WLTI may refer to:

WLTI (AM) (1550) in New Castle, Indiana, which assumed this call sign in 2010
WKLZ (105.9) in Syracuse, New York, used the call sign from 1996 to 2010
WDRQ (93.1) in Detroit, Michigan, used the call sign from 1985 to 1996
WUML (105.9) in Lowell, Massachusetts, used the call sign from 1967 to 1975